Dragonslayer is a 1981 American dark fantasy film directed by Matthew Robbins from a screenplay he co-wrote with Hal Barwood. It stars Peter MacNicol, Ralph Richardson, John Hallam and Caitlin Clarke. It had a co-production between Paramount Pictures and Walt Disney Productions, where Paramount handled North American distribution and Disney's Buena Vista International handled international distribution. The story is set in a fictional medieval kingdom, where a young wizard experiences danger and opposition as he hunts the dragon, Vermithrax Pejorative.

It is the second joint production between Paramount and Disney, after Popeye (1980), and is more mature than most contemporary Disney films. Because the audience expected the Disney name to be solely children's entertainment, the film's violence, adult themes, and brief nudity were somewhat controversial, though Disney did not hold the US distribution rights. The film was rated PG in the U.S.

The special effects were created at Industrial Light and Magic, the first use of ILM outside of a Lucasfilm production. Phil Tippett had co-developed an animation technique there for The Empire Strikes Back (1980) called go motion, a variation on stop motion. This led to the film's nomination for the Academy Award for Best Visual Effects, but it lost to Raiders of the Lost Ark, the only other Visual Effects nominee that year, whose special effects were also provided by ILM. Including the hydraulic  model, the dragon consists of 16 puppets dedicated to flying, crawling, or fire breathing.

The film was nominated for the Academy Award for Best Original Score, which went to Chariots of Fire. It was nominated for a Hugo Award for Best Dramatic Presentation, again given to Raiders of the Lost Ark. On October 21, 2003, Dragonslayer was released on DVD in the U.S. by Paramount Home Entertainment. The film will be re-released in remastered format on Blu-ray and 4K Ultra HD on March 21, 2023 in the U.S. by Paramount Home Entertainment.

Plot 
Urland, a sixth-century post-Roman kingdom situated near the River Ur, is being terrorized by Vermithrax Pejorative, a 400-year-old dragon. To appease the creature, King Casiodorus offers it virgin girls selected by lottery twice a year. An expedition led by a young man called Valerian seeks help from the last sorcerer, Ulrich of Cragganmore.

The expedition is followed by Tyrian, the brutal and cynical Captain of Casiodorus's Royal Guard. He and his lieutenant Jerbul openly intimidate the wizard, doubtful of his abilities. Ulrich invites Tyrian to stab him to prove his magical powers. Tyrian does so and Ulrich dies instantly, to the horror of his young apprentice Galen Bradwarden and his elderly servant Hodge, who cremates Ulrich's body and places the ashes in a leather pouch. Hodge informs Galen that Ulrich wanted his ashes spread over a lake of burning water.

Galen is selected by the wizard's magical amulet as its next owner; encouraged, he journeys to Urland. On the way, he discovers Valerian is a young woman, who is disguised to avoid being selected in the lottery. In an effort to discourage the expedition, Tyrian kills Hodge. Just before dying, he hands Galen the pouch of ashes.

Arriving in Urland, Galen inspects the dragon's lair and thinks that he magically seals its entrance with a rock slide. Tyrian apprehends Galen and takes him to Castle Morgenthorme, from which King Casiodorus governs Urland. Casiodorus guesses that Galen is not a real wizard and complains that his attack may have angered the dragon instead of killing it, as his brother and predecessor once did. The king confiscates the amulet and imprisons Galen. His daughter, Princess Elspeth, visits Galen and is shocked when he informs her of rumors that the lottery is rigged; it excludes her name and those who are rich enough to bribe the king into disqualifying their children. Her father is unable to lie convincingly when she confronts him over this.

Meanwhile, the dragon frees itself from its prison and causes an earthquake. Galen narrowly escapes from his prison, but without the amulet. The village priest, Brother Jacopus, leads his congregation to confront the dragon, denouncing it as the Devil. The dragon incinerates him and then heads for the village of Swanscombe, burning all in its path.

When the lottery begins anew, Elspeth rigs the draw so that only her name can be chosen. Consequently, King Casiodorus returns the amulet to Galen so that he might save Elspeth. Galen uses the amulet to enchant a heavy spear that had been forged by Valerian's father (which he had dubbed Sicarius Dracorum, or "Dragonslayer") with the ability to pierce the dragon's armored hide. Valerian gathers some molted dragon scales to create a shield for Galen. Valerian laments now that her cross-dressing disguise is blown, she will be eligible for the lottery since she is still a virgin, and that Galen has fallen in love with Princess Elspeth. Galen admits he has fallen in love, but it's Valerian, not Elspeth, he's in love with. The couple kisses, thus realizing their romantic feelings for each other.

Attempting to rescue Elspeth, Galen fights Tyrian and kills him, emerging victorious. The Princess, however, is determined to make amends for all the girls whose names have been chosen in the past; she descends into the dragon's cave and to her death. Galen follows her and finds a brood of young dragons feasting on her corpse. He kills them and finds Vermithrax resting by an underground lake of fire. He manages to wound the dragon, but the spear is broken. Only Valerian's shield saves him from incineration.

After his failure to kill Vermithrax, Valerian convinces Galen to leave Swanscombe with her. As both prepare to depart, the amulet gives Galen a vision explaining his teacher's final wish to use Galen to deliver him to Urland. Ulrich had asked that his ashes be spread over "burning water", which is in the dragon's cave. Galen realizes that the wizard had planned his own death and cremation, realizing he was too old and frail to make the journey.

Galen returns to the cave. When he spreads the ashes over the fiery lake, the wizard is resurrected within the flames. Ulrich reveals that his time is short, and that Galen must destroy the amulet "when the time is right". The wizard then transports himself to a mountaintop, where he summons a storm and confronts Vermithrax. After a brief battle, the monster snatches the old man and flies away with him. Cued by Ulrich, Galen crushes the amulet with a rock. The wizard's body explodes and kills the dragon, whose corpse falls out of the sky.

In the aftermath, villagers inspecting the wreckage credit God with the victory. The king arrives and drives a sword into the dragon's broken carcass to claim the glory for himself. As Galen and Valerian leave Urland together, he confesses that he misses both Ulrich and the amulet. He says, "I just wish we had a horse." Suddenly, a white horse appears, insinuating that the power of the amulet is now within Galen himself. The couple mounts the horse and rides away.

Cast 

 Peter MacNicol as Galen Bradwarden
 Caitlin Clarke as Valerian
 Ralph Richardson as Ulrich of Cragganmore
 John Hallam as Tyrian
 Peter Eyre as King Casiodorus Ulfilas
 Albert Salmi as Greil (dubbed by Norman Rodway)
 Sydney Bromley as Hodge
 Chloe Salaman as Princess Elspeth Ulfilas
 Emrys James as Simon (Valerian's Father)
 Roger Kemp as Horsrick, Casiodorus's Chamberlain
 Ian McDiarmid as Brother Jacopus

Production

Conception 
According to Hal Barwood, he and Matthew Robbins got the inspiration for Dragonslayer from The Sorcerer's Apprentice sequence in Fantasia. They later came up with a story after researching St. George and the Dragon. Barwood and Robbins rejected the traditional conceptions of the medieval world in order to give the film more realism: "our film has no knights in shining armor, no pennants streaming in the breeze, no delicate ladies with diaphanous veils waving from turreted castles, no courtly love, no holy grail. Instead, they set out to create a very strange world with a lot of weird values and customs, steeped in superstition, where the clothes and manners of the people were rough, their homes and villages primitive and their countryside almost primeval, so that the idea of magic would be a natural part of their existence." For this reason, they chose to set the film after the end of Roman rule in Britain, prior to the arrival of Christianity. Barwood and Robins began to hastily work on the story outline on June 25, 1979 and completed in early August. They received numerous refusals from various film studios, due to their inexperience in budget negotiations. The screenplay was eventually accepted by Paramount Pictures and Walt Disney Productions, becoming the two studios' second joint effort after Popeye (1980).

Dragon 

Twenty-five percent of the film's budget went into the dragon's special effects. Graphic artist David Bunnett was assigned to design the look, and was fed ideas on the movement mechanics, and then rendered the concepts on paper. It was decided early to emphasize flying, because the most important sequence is the final battle. Bunnett gave it a degree of personality, deliberately trying to avoid the creature from Alien, which he believed was "too hideous to look at".

After Bunnett handed his storyboard panels to the film crew, the dragon design used a wide variety of techniques. The final creature is a composite of several different models. Phil Tippett of ILM finalized the design, and sculpted a reference model which Danny Lee of Disney Studios closely followed in constructing the larger dragon props for close-up shots. Two months later, Lee's team finished a sixteen-foot head and neck assembly, a twenty-foot tail, thighs, legs, claws capable of grabbing a man, and a  wing section. The parts were flown to Pinewood Studios outside London in the cargo hold of a Boeing 747.

Brian Johnson was hired to supervise the special effects, and began planning on- and off-set effects with various specialists. Dennis Muren, the effects cameraman, stated, "We knew the dragon had a lot more importance to this film than some of the incidental things that appeared in only a few shots in Star Wars or The Empire Strikes Back. The dragon had to be presented in a way that the audience would be absolutely stunned."

After the completion of principal shooting, a special effects team of eighty people at ILM studios in northern California worked eight months in producing 160 composite shots of the dragon. Chris Walas sculpted and operated the dragon head used for close-up shots. The head measured eight feet in length. The model was animated by a combination of radio controls, cable controls, air bladders, levers, and by handthus giving the illusion of a fully coordinated face with a wide range of expression. Real World War II era flamethrowers were used for the dragon's fire breathing effects. The animals used for the dragon's vocalizations included lions, tigers, leopards, jaguars, alligators, pigs, camels, and elephants.

Phil Tippett built a model for the dragon's walking scenes. He did not want to use standard stop motion animation techniques, and had his team build a dragon model which would move during each exposure, rather than in between, as was once the standard. This process, named "go motion" by Tippett, recorded the creature's movements in motion as a real animal would move, and removed the jerkiness common in prior stop motion films.

Ken Ralston was assigned to the flying scenes. He built a model with an articulated aluminum skeleton for a wide range of motion. Ralston shot films of birds flying in order to incorporate their movements into the model. As with the walking dragon, the flying model was filmed using go-motion techniques. The camera was programmed to tilt and move at various angles in order to convey the sensation of flight.

Casting 
Peter MacNicol first met Robbins in the office of casting director, Debby Brown, who'd seen MacNicol's work as Benvolio in Romeo and Juliet at the Guthrie Theater in Minneapolis. She'd left a note backstage for him, encouraging him to move to New York saying, "he would do well there". He took her advice. On his first day in New York MacNicol stopped by Brown's office to tell her he was now a Manhattan resident. While there, he heard the loud voices of actors coming from Brown's audition room. He asked Brown if there was anything right for him in the project. She responded with a smile, "Well...actually, there is." An hour later, MacNicol was the front runner for the role of Galen. He was flown to England along with Caitlin Clarke for a screen test. Within a day or two, Paramount and Disney had said yes, and he was renting a flat in Chelsea. MacNicol had grown up riding horses—his first paid job was on a ranch near Arlington, Texas—so the young actor knew how to ride, even jump hurdles without a saddle but during his pre-filming he needed to learn to ride the type of trooper-style saddle they were using in the movie. And because he'd have to ride on camera during action sequences his riding skills had to be stress-tested.  "They took away my stirrups, they took away my reins and whipped the horse, and then they told me to windmill my arms and turn a complete circle in the saddle. Then they took away the saddle!" The young actor had already worked for two years in classical repertory theater, and was highly trained in voice production. Nevertheless, a voice coach was hired to achieve the mid-Atlantic sound the role required. Having studied stage combat at the University of Minnesota (two years of classes in tumbling, foil, saber rapier and dagger) he was eager to do as much of the fighting as they'd allow. The role also required some juggling and magic tricks. For this, he was mentored by British prestidigitator Harold Taylor, who had previously performed for the British royal family.

Caitlin Clarke was initially hesitant to involve herself in the film, as she was preparing to audition for a play in Chicago. Her agent insisted, though, and after doing an audition tape, was called back for more tests. Clarke failed them, but managed to pass after doing another test at Robbins's insistence. She got along well with Ralph Richardson, and stated that he taught her more in one rehearsal than she had learned in years of acting classes.

Set design 

Elliot Scott was hired to design the sets of the film's sixth-century world. He temporarily converted the 13th-century Dolwyddelan Castle into Ulrich's ramshackle sixth-century fortress, to the surprise of the locals. He built the entire village of Swanscombe on a farm outside London. Although Scott extensively researched medieval architecture in the British Museum and his own library, he took some artistic liberties in creating the thatched roof houses, the granary, Simon's house, and smithy and Casiodorus's castle, because he was unable to find enough information on their exact look. He built the interior of the dragon's lair, using  of polystyrene and 40 tons of Welsh slate and shale. The shots of the Welsh and Scottish landscapes were extended through the use of over three dozen matte paintings.

Nearly all of the outdoor scenes were shot in North Wales. The final scene was shot in Skye, Scotland.

Costumes 
The costumes were designed by Anthony Mendelson, who consulted the British Museum, the London Library, and his own reference files to evoke the designs of the early Middle Ages. They are roughly stitched and use colors which would have been possible with the vegetable dyes of the time. The costumes of Casiodorus and his court were designed of fine silk, as opposed to the coarsely woven clothes of the Urlanders.

Music 
The film's Academy Award-nominated score was composed by Alex North. The score's linear conception was developed through transparently layered and polyphonic orchestral texture, dominated by a medieval-style modal harmony. It was largely based on five major thematic concepts:
 the suffering of the Urlanders; 
 a "magic" motif;  
 the amulet;  
 the sacrificial virgins;  
 the relationship between Galen and Valerian.

North had six weeks to compose the score, which features music rejected from his score for Stanley Kubrick's 2001: A Space Odyssey. The opening sequence of Dragonslayer features a reworking of his original music for the opening of 2001s "Dawn of Man" sequence—which in that final film is played without music—and a waltz representing the dragon in flight which had been a variation of the cue "Space Station Docking", which in the final cut of 2001 was replaced by The Blue Danube. North was disappointed by the resulting dragon scenes, as they do not use the entirety of the pieces he composed for them. He later stated that he had written "a very lovely waltz for when the dragon first appears, with just a slight indication that this may not be a bad dragon". The waltz was replaced by tracks used earlier in the movie.

The score was widely praised. Pauline Kael wrote in the New Yorker that the score was a "beauty", and that "at times, the music and the fiery dragon seem one". Royal S. Brown of Fanfare Magazine praised the soundtrack as "one of the best scores of 1981".

On April 22, 2010, a limited-edition soundtrack CD was released on La-La Land Records.

Reception

Box office 
The film grossed just over $14 million in the US with an estimated budget of $18 million. It later became a cult film.

Critical response 
At the review aggregator website Rotten Tomatoes, the film has an 83% score based on 35 reviews, with an average rating of 6.7/10. The site's critic consensus reads, "An atypically dark Disney adventure, Dragonslayer puts a realistic spin — and some impressive special effects — on a familiar tale." At Metacritic, the film has a weighted average score of 68 out of 100 based on 13 critics, indicating "generally favorable reviews".

The book Flights of Fancy: The Great Fantasy Film says: "Dragonslayer is a compelling and often brilliant fantasy film [... but] it seeks, as well, to impose modern sensibilities on its medieval characters and plot—twentieth-century political, sociological, and religious sensibilities which only serve to dilute its particular strengths."

Gene Siskel and Roger Ebert both gave the film three stars out of four in their respective print reviews. Siskel praised the "dazzling special effects" and the "convincing portrait by Ralph Richardson of the aged magician Ulrich", and Ebert called the scenes involving the dragon "first-rate".

Kevin Thomas of the Los Angeles Times called Vermithrax "the greatest dragon yet", and praised the film for its effective evocation of the Dark Ages.

David Denby of New York praised Dragonslayers special effects and lauded the film as being much better than Excalibur and Raiders of the Lost Ark.

David Sterritt of The Christian Science Monitor praised the sets and pacing of the film, and criticized it for lack of originality, stressing that MacNicol's and Richardson's characters bore too many similarities to the heroes of Star Wars. A similar critique was given by John Coleman of the New Statesman, who called the film a "turgid sword-and-sorcery fable, with Ralph Richardson in a backdated kind of Star Wars of Alec Guinness role".

Tim Pulleine of the Monthly Film Bulletin criticized the film's lack of narrative drive and clarity to supplement the special effects. Upon the film's first television broadcast, Gannett News Service columnist Mike Hughes called the story "slight" and "slow-paced", but admired a "lyrical beauty to the setting and mood". Nonetheless, he warned: "In movie theaters, that came across wonderfully; on a little TV screen, this may be strictly for specialized tastes."

Alex Keneas of Newsday criticized the focus on superstition, and for being "bereft of any sense of medieval time, place and society".

Larry DiTillio reviewed Dragonslayer for Different Worlds magazine and stated that "Much imagination went into the re-creation of this world and fans will revel in it when they see it."

Christopher John reviewed Dragonslayer in Ares Magazine and commented that "Though the dialogue is occasionally stiff, there is a believable reality. When the people and setting of a fantasy are as carefully wrought as they are here, it is easy to get an audience to accept as small and wonderful a thing as a dragon."

Vermithrax Pejorative 
Guillermo del Toro has stated that along with Maleficent in Sleeping Beauty, Vermithrax is his favorite cinematic dragon. He further stated that: "One of the best and one of the strongest landmarks [of dragon movies] that almost nobody can overcome is Dragonslayer. The design of Vermithrax Pejorative is perhaps one of the most perfect creature designs ever made."

A Song of Ice and Fire author George R. R. Martin once ranked it the fifth best fantasy film of all time, and called Vermithrax "the best dragon ever put on film [with] the coolest dragon name". Vermithrax is mentioned as an Easter egg in a list of dragons' names in the fourth episode of that book series adaptation, Game of Thrones. Fantasy author Alex Bledsoe stated: "...everyone has a 'first dragon', the one that awoke their sense of wonder about the creatures. For many it's Anne McCaffrey's elaborate world of Pern, where genetically-engineered intelligent dragons bond with their riders; for others it's Smaug in The Hobbit, guarding his hoard deep in a cave. But for me, it was the awesome Vermithrax from the 1981 film, Dragonslayer."

During filming of Return of the Jedi, in which Ian McDiarmid, who portrays minor character Brother Jacopus in Dragonslayer, stars as the film's main antagonist, Emperor Palpatine, the ILM crew jokingly placed a model of Vermithrax in the arms of the Rancor model and took a picture. The picture was included in the book Star Wars: Chronicles. A creature based on the appearance of this dragon appears in one of Jabba the Hutt's creature pens in Inside the Worlds of Star Wars Trilogy.

Related media 
A novelization Dragonslayer was written by Wayland Drew that delves deeper into the background of many of the characters.

Marvel Comics published three formats of Dragonslayer adaptations in 1981. All were by the same team. These were a magazine-size issue, a two-issue standard comic size adaptation, and a paperback format (Marvel Illustrated) of the two comic books in 160 pages, due to the smaller pages. Credits include writer Dennis O'Neil, and artists Marie Severin and John Tartaglione, in Marvel Super Special #20.

Simulations Publications, Inc. produced the board game Dragonslayer, designed by Brad Hessel and Redmond A. Simonsen.

Australian label Southern Cross initially released an unauthorized soundtrack album in 1983 on LP (a boxed audiophile pressing, at 45 rpm), and in 1990 on CD. The first official and improved CD release came in 2010 by U.S. label La-La Land Records. The new album features newly mastered audio from the original LCR (Left-Center-Right) mix, previously unreleased source music, and alternative takes.

See also 
 List of films featuring eclipses

References

External links 

1981 films
American fantasy adventure films
1980s English-language films
1980s fantasy adventure films
Films about dragons
Films about wizards
Films adapted into comics
Films directed by Matthew Robbins
Films scored by Alex North
Films set in castles
Films set in the 6th century
Films shot at Pinewood Studios
Films using stop-motion animation
Films with screenplays by Matthew Robbins
American sword and sorcery films
Walt Disney Pictures films
Paramount Pictures films
1980s American films